"A Touch of Evil" is a song by the English heavy metal band Judas Priest, from their 1990 album Painkiller. The record was released as the second single from the album via Columbia Records label.

Overview
It is the only song on the album that was co-written by producer Chris Tsangarides, who wrote the song's guitar riff, while the rest of the song was written by the main songwriting team of Rob Halford, K. K. Downing, and Glenn Tipton. Tsangarides would team up again with Tipton for songwriting eleven years later, for Judas Priest's album Demolition, released in 2001, on which the two of them wrote the songs "Subterfuge" and "Metal Messiah".

It is one of the few songs on the album on which the synthesizers (which had originally been featured on several songs, but had been removed from some) remained part of the song. These synthesizers were played by rock veteran keyboardist Don Airey. Between the slow drums and the eerie keyboards, the song was given a chilling sound, making it a sort of pseudo-ballad. However, when played live, the keyboard intro is replaced by a guitar riff.

The song's lyrics deal with demonic possession, black magic, and temptation to commit acts of evil. However, according to Halford himself, as cited in Metal Hammer in January 2004, the lyrics deal with a love-related theme, although metaphorically.

The song features a classically-inspired guitar solo by Glenn Tipton.

Personnel
 Rob Halford – vocals
 Glenn Tipton – lead guitar
 K. K. Downing – rhythm guitar
 Ian Hill – bass (credit only)
 Scott Travis – drums

with:
 Don Airey – keyboards, moogbass

Music video
A music video was made for the song, vividly depicting each element of the song's lyrics. The video shows a young boy having various visions of things, while flashing images of the band playing the song in between, similar to the way the band are seen in the "Painkiller" video. The song was edited for the music video, and was cut from 5:42 to 4:54, and—among other things—a notable amount of Tipton's guitar solo was cut out from the song.

Charts

References

1990 songs
1991 singles
Judas Priest songs
Songs written by Glenn Tipton
Songs written by K. K. Downing
Songs written by Rob Halford
Columbia Records singles
Heavy metal ballads